Luís Gonçalves (born 12 October 1987) is a Portuguese visually-impaired sprint runner, who competes mainly in category T12 events.

Career 
Gonçalves made his senior international debut in 2007 at the IBSA World Championships in São Paulo, Brazil. The following year, he achieved his first major result by winning a silver medal in the men's 400 metres T12 event at the 2008 Summer Paralympics in Beijing, China.

At the 2011 IPC Athletics World Championships in Christchurch, New Zealand, Gonçalves won the 400 metres T12 and consequently his first-ever gold medal. He also secured two silver medals in the 200 metres T12 and 4 × 100 metres relay T11–13 events.

In 2015, Gonçalves won his second 400 metres gold medal at the World Championships in Doha, Qatar. The following year, Gonçalves added a second Paralympic medal to his tally, winning the 400 metres T12 bronze at the 2016 Summer Paralympics in Rio de Janeiro.

External links

Paralympic athletes of Portugal
Athletes (track and field) at the 2008 Summer Paralympics
Paralympic silver medalists for Portugal
Living people
Portuguese male sprinters
Paralympic bronze medalists for Portugal
Athletes (track and field) at the 2016 Summer Paralympics
1987 births
Medalists at the 2008 Summer Paralympics
Medalists at the 2016 Summer Paralympics
World Para Athletics Championships winners
Medalists at the World Para Athletics Championships
Medalists at the World Para Athletics European Championships
Paralympic medalists in athletics (track and field)
People from Portalegre, Portugal
Sportspeople from Portalegre District
Visually impaired sprinters
Paralympic sprinters
Blind people
Portuguese people with disabilities